Tim Rigby may refer to:

 Tim Rigby (politician), politician in Ontario, Canada
 Tim Rigby (sportscaster), sports anchor for WJAC-TV in Pennsylvania, USA
 Tim Rigby (stuntman)